Christopher John Olver (born  in Manchester, England) is an English former rugby union hooker who played for England, Northampton Saints and Harlequins. Olver was known for his aggressive style of play and holds the somewhat undesirable record for spending the most number of minutes on the England substitutes bench.

Olver won his first international cap against Argentina on 3 November 1990 and went on to gain 3 full caps for England. His international career suffered due to the form of another English hooker Brian Moore however he was still regarded as the first choice reserve hooker for the England team for much of the early nineties. In the absence of sixteen England players on tour with the British Lions, Olver was chosen as captain for the 1993 England rugby union tour of Canada and led England in the two international matches against Canada, for which full caps were not awarded.

Upon retirement Olver went into teaching and is now master-in-charge of Rugby at Oundle School.

John Olver is the uncle of Sale players Tom and Ben Curry, both of whom have played for England.  Their mother is John Olver's sister.

References

External links

1961 births
Living people
England international rugby union players
English rugby union coaches
English rugby union players
Schoolteachers from Northamptonshire
Teachers of Oundle School
Middlesex County RFU players
Northampton Saints players
Rugby union hookers
Rugby union players from Manchester